Nguyễn Vũ Phong (born February 6, 1985) is a former Vietnamese footballer who currently coaches Vĩnh Long FC. Nguyễn Vũ Phong was a member of Vietnam national football team. Mainly an  attacking midfielder, Phong is known for his speed and shooting ability. He is also the first Vietnamese footballer to receive a call-up to the Vietnam national football team from the Vietnamese Second Division in 2006.

International goals

Vietnam

Honours

Club
Becamex Binh Duong F.C.
 V.League 1 (2): 2007, 2008
 Vietnamese Super Cup (2): 2007, 2008

International
ASEAN Football Championship
Champion: 2008
Third place: 2007, 2010
Vietnamese Golden Ball
Silver ball: 2009
Bronze ball: 2007, 2010

References

External links
Tribute to NGUYEN VU PHONG

1985 births
Living people
Vietnamese footballers
Association football wingers
2007 AFC Asian Cup players
Footballers at the 2006 Asian Games
People from Vĩnh Long province
Becamex Binh Duong FC players
SHB Da Nang FC players
V.League 1 players
Asian Games competitors for Vietnam
Vietnam international footballers